Lycomorpha pholus, the black-and-yellow lichen moth, is a moth in the family Erebidae. It is found in North America from Nova Scotia to North Carolina, west to South Dakota and Texas. The habitat consists of short-grass prairie.

The wingspan is 25–32 mm. Adults have bluish-black wings, with a yellow, orange or red basal area and black distal area. Adults are on wing from July to September. They fly during the day and are attracted to flowers, including goldenrod. The adults are thought to mimic poisonous Lycid beetles, such as Calopteron species.

The larvae feed on lichen and resemble their host. The species may take several years to develop, depending on the location. Pupation takes place in hairy cocoons attached to rocks or tree trunks near the host.

Subspecies
Lycomorpha pholus pholus
Lycomorpha pholus miniata Packard, 1872 (central North American)

References

Moths described in 1773
Cisthenina
Moths of North America
Taxa named by Dru Drury